Valeriya Mammadova (née Korotenko, ; born 29 January 1984) is a retired Azerbaijani volleyball player who played as a Libero. She was a member of Azerbaijan women's national volleyball team and was selected as the Best Libero of European Volleyball Championship in 2005 and 2017.

Career
Born in Baku, Valeriya first played volleyball at age nine and joined the school volleyball team.

She played 180 times for the Azerbaijan women's national volleyball team and was awarded the best libero of 2005 Women's European Volleyball Championship.

Mammadova was a member of Azerrail Baku and Volero Zurich before joining Fenerbahçe Women's Volleyball team. She won the bronze medal at the 2008–09 CEV Cup playing with Fenerbahçe Acıbadem and was awarded "Best Receiver".

She is married to Azerbaijani judoka Nijat Mammadov. 

Mammadova played with Azerrail Baku winning the 2015–16 Azerbaijan Super League championship and she became Best Libero.

Awards

Individuals
 2001-02 CEV Top Teams Cup "Best Libero"
 2004-05 CEV Champions' League "Best Libero"
 2005 European Championship "Best Libero"
 2005 Yeltsin Cup "Best Libero"
 2005-06 CEV Champions' League "Best Libero"
 2006 FIVB World Grand Prix - European Qualification "Best Libero"
 2006 FIVB World Grand Prix Preliminary Round "Best Libero"
 2007-08 Turkish League "Best Libero"
 2008-09 CEV Cup "Best Libero"
 2010 World Championship 2nd Qualification Round "Best Receiver"
 2010 World Championship 2nd Qualification Round "Best Libero"
 2010 World Championship 3rd Qualification Round "Best Receiver"
 2009-10 Azerbaijan Cup "Best Libero"
 2010-2011 CEV GM Challenge Cup Final "Best Player"
 2015–16 Azerbaijan Super League "Best Libero"
 2017 European Championship "Best Libero"

Club
 2001-02 CEV Cup -  Champion, with Azerrail Baku
 2007 Swiss Women's Volleyball League -  Champion, with Voléro Zürich
 2008-09 Turkish Women's Volleyball League -  Champion, with Fenerbahçe Acıbadem
 2010-11 Azerbaijan Women's Volleyball Super League -  Runner-Up, with Azerrail Baku
 2012–13 Azerbaijan Women's Volleyball Super League -  Runner-Up, with Azerrail Baku
 2015–16 Azerbaijan Super League -  Champion, with Azerrail Baku

References

External links
 

1984 births
Living people
Sportspeople from Baku
Azerbaijani women's volleyball players
Azerbaijani expatriate sportspeople in Turkey
Expatriate volleyball players in Switzerland
Expatriate volleyball players in Turkey
Fenerbahçe volleyballers
European Games competitors for Azerbaijan
Volleyball players at the 2015 European Games
Lokomotiv Baku volleyball players
Liberos
Azerbaijani people of Ukrainian descent
Azerbaijani expatriate sportspeople in Switzerland